Lisa Tessier Marrache is an American physician and politician from Maine. Marrache served as a Democratic State Senator from Maine's 25th District, representing much of Kennebec County, including population centers of Waterville and Winslow as well as two communities in Somerset County, including Pittsfield. She was first elected to the Maine State Senate in 2006 and withdrew from re-election in 2010 after winning the uncontested Democratic nomination. From 2008 to 2010, Marrache served as Assistant Senate Majority Leader.

In 1999, Marrache was first elected to public office as a city councilor in Waterville. A year later, she was elected to the Maine House of Representatives. She was re-elected in 2002 and 2004 before replacing Kenneth Gagnon in the Maine Senate in 2006.

Personal
Marrache earned a B.S. in chemistry from Columbus State University in Georgia and her M.D. from Medical College of Georgia.

References

Year of birth missing (living people)
Living people
Democratic Party Maine state senators
Politicians from Waterville, Maine
Physicians from Maine
Columbus State University alumni
Georgia Health Sciences University alumni
Women state legislators in Maine
Democratic Party members of the Maine House of Representatives
21st-century American politicians
21st-century American women politicians